Lorenzo Alvisi is an Italian computer scientist and Tisch University Professor at Cornell University. Prior to joining Cornell, he was a University Distinguished Teaching Professor and the holder of the Endowed Professorship #5 at University of Texas at Austin. His research focuses on distributed systems and dependability. He holds a  laurea in Physics from the University of Bologna (1987), and an MS and PhD in Computer Science from Cornell University (1994 and 1996, respectively). He is a Fellow of the Institute of Electrical and Electronics Engineers and of the Association for Computing Machinery.

References

Year of birth missing (living people)
Living people
University of Texas at Austin faculty
American computer scientists
Cornell University faculty
Researchers in distributed computing
Fellow Members of the IEEE
Fellows of the Association for Computing Machinery
Cornell University alumni
Italian computer scientists
University of Bologna alumni